Maja Erkić (born 13 May 1985) is a Slovenian basketball player. She currently playing in the First League of Hungary for Atomerőmű SE. She is a member of the Slovenian national team.

References

External links
Profile at eurobasket.com

1985 births
Living people
Slovenian expatriate basketball people in Italy
Slovenian expatriate basketball people in Spain
Slovenian expatriate sportspeople in Hungary
Slovenian women's basketball players
Small forwards
Sportspeople from Slovenj Gradec